The Ministry of Urban Development is a government ministry of Nepal responsible for the development of urban areas in the country. As of 13 July 2021, the ministry is headed by Prime Minister Sher Bahdur Deuba (Interim).

Organisational structure
The Ministry of Urban Development has several departments and subdivisions to facilitate and implement its work:
 Department of Urban Development and Building Construction
 Kathmandu Valley Development Authority
 Rastriya Awas Company Limited
 Town Development Fund
 High Powered Committee for Integrated Development of the Bagmati Civilization
 Department of Water Supply and Sewerage

Former Ministers of Urban Development
This is a list of former Ministers of Urban Development since the Nepalese Constituent Assembly election in 2013:

See also
 Nepal Building Codes

References

Urban Development
Urban development ministries